Wallop is the eighth studio album by American dance-punk group !!!, released on August 30, 2019, on Warp Records. It was recorded primarily in Brooklyn at frontman Nic Offer's apartment. It features vocal contributions by Meah Pace of !!!, Cameron Mesirow, Angus Andrew of Liars and Maria Uzor of Sink Ya Teeth.

Release
The double A-side single "UR Paranoid" / "Off the Grid" was released on May 30, 2019. Wallop was announced on June 19, 2019, alongside the release of "Serbia Drums" as a single. "This Is the Door" was released as a single on August 6, 2019. "Couldn't Have Known" was released as the album's final single on August 27, 2019.

Reception

Zahraa Hmood of Exclaim! gave the album a positive review, writing, "Occasionally on Wallop, !!! sound either too world-weary or too committed to being incendiary to relay ideas relevant to listeners. But at their best, the band maintain their convictions about privilege, power and culture and present them as defiant, monumental tracks."

Track listing 
Credits adapted from the liner notes of Wallop.

Notes
  signifies an additional producer.
  signifies a vocal producer.

Personnel
Performance
 Nic Offer – vocals, keyboards, drum programming
 Rafael Cohen – vocals, guitar, bass, keyboards, drum programming
 Mario Andreoni – guitar, bass, keyboards, drum programming 
 Dan Gorman – keyboards, trumpet
 Chris Egan – drums
 Meah Pace – additional vocals (2–6, 9, 13, 14)
 Angus Andrew – additional vocals (3, 4)
 Molly Schnick – additional vocals (5)
 Amanda Lovejoy Street – additional vocals (7, 8)
 Cameron Mesirow – additional vocals (7, 8), additional synth (12)
 Maria Uzor – additional vocals (7, 8)
 Nicole Fayu – additional vocals (7, 8)
 Robbie Lee – saxophone (13, 14)
 Sam Kulik – trombone (13, 14)
 Kenny Warren – trumpet (13, 14)

Technical
 Mark Bengtson – recording , additional production 
 Bart Migal – vocal production 
 Chris Egan – recording 
 Matt Wiggins – mixing 
 Justin Van Der Volgen – mixing 
 Josh Bonati – mastering
 Caleb Halter – design

Charts

References

2019 albums
!!! albums
Warp (record label) albums
Albums produced by Cole M. Greif-Neill